Asahara (written: 朝原 lit. "morning field", 浅原 lit. "shallow field" or 麻原 lit. "cannabis field") is a Japanese surname. Notable people with the surname include:

Akira Asahara, Japanese Magic: The Gathering player
 (born 1972), Japanese sprinter and long jumper
 (1955–2018), Japanese religious leader, founder of Aum Shinrikyo and terrorist mastermind
 (born 1987), Japanese international rugby union player

Japanese-language surnames